John J.McCusker is the Ewing Halsell Distinguished Professor of American History and Professor of Economics at Trinity University, San Antonio, Texas.

Early life and education
McCusker grew up in upstate New York.  He did graduate work at the University of Rochester, where he studied with Robert W. Fogel, the 1993 Nobel Laureate in Economic Science; at the University College of the University of London, where he worked under Harry C. Allen; and at the University of Pittsburgh, where Carter Goodrich directed his doctoral dissertation, receiving his degree in 1970.

Teaching career
McCusker taught at the University of Maryland, College Park for 24 years. In 1992, he moved to Texas, and taught at Trinity University until he retired in 2015. He offered courses in the general US history, US economic and business history, and the history of seventeenth and eighteenth century British America. In addition he has served, in an honorary capacity, since 1994 as Adjunct Professor of early American History at the University of Texas, in Austin.

Publications
 Money and Exchange in Europe and America, 1600-1775: A Handbook (1978; reissued with corrections, 1992) 
 European Marine Lists and Bills of Entry: Early Commercial Publications and the Origins of the Business Press (1985)
 The Economy of British America, 1607-1789 (1985; 2nd ed., with a supplementary bibliography, 1991), co-authored with Russell Menard 
 Rum and the American Revolution: The Rum Trade and the Balance of Payments of the Thirteen Continental Colonies (1989)
 The Beginnings of Commercial and Financial Journalism: The Commodity Price Currents, Exchange Rate Currents, and Money Currents of Early Modern Europe (1991), co-authored with Cora Gravesteijn
 How Much Is That in Real Money? A Historical Price Index for Use as a Deflator of Money Values in the Economy of the United States (1992; reprinted, 1993; 2nd ed., rev., 2001)
 Essays in the Economic History of the Atlantic World (1997) 
 Co-edited with Kenneth Morgan, The Early Modern Atlantic Economy (2001) 

The Economy of British America won two honors: the Outstanding Academic Book for 1985-1986 by Choice and a Distinguished Book Award, Honorable Mention, by the Society of Colonial Wars.

Personal life
McCusker is married to Ann Van Pelt; they have five children: Terrie F. Conner, Kenneth W. Florance, John J. McCusker III, Patrick W. McCusker and Dr. Margaret E. McCusker.

References

External links
John J. McCusker, University of Texas website 
Professor John J. McCusker, Trinity University website

University of Maryland, College Park faculty
Year of birth missing (living people)
Living people
University of Rochester alumni
Trinity University (Texas) faculty